Banff and Buchan may refer to:
 Banff and Buchan, a committee area of the Aberdeenshire Council, and a former district of the Grampian region, Scotland
 Banff and Buchan (UK Parliament constituency), a constituency represented in the House of Commons of the Parliament of the United Kingdom
 Banff and Buchan (Scottish Parliament constituency), a constituency represented in the Scottish Parliament